Secret Square is the eponymous album by Secret Square. A lo-fi album with songs written by Hilarie Sidney and Lisa Janssen, it consists of seven original songs and four demos. The release went largely unnoticed. Sidney herself states "not a lot of people have" heard it. The album and the previously released single remain cult collector's items among Elephant 6 fans. Jim McIntyre of Von Hemmling provides bass for "Light of the Sun".

Track listing 
 "I Love J.S." (L. Janssen) – 2:13
 "I've Been Watching" (H. Sidney) – 2:57
 "Plunky" (L. Janssen, H. Sidney) – 4:26
 "We Know" (L. Janssen) – 2:33
 "Sparkly Green Couch" (H. Sidney) – 2:31
 "Sad Endings" (L. Janssen) – 2:27
 "Means of Escape" (L. Janssen) – 3:53
 "Candy Says" (L. Reed) – 3:33
 "Relative" (L. Janssen) – 2:57
 "Light of the Sun" (H. Sidney) – 1:34
 "Aerodynamic (glendora mix)" (H. Sidney) – 3:02

References

External links
Secret Square at Elephant6.com.
Optical Atlas

The Elephant 6 Recording Company albums
1995 albums
Secret Square albums